Wink is the third studio album by Japanese rock quartet Chai, released on May 21, 2021. It is their first record on Sub Pop, following two albums on the now-defunct Burger Records.

Wink was greeted with critical applause upon its release, with praise going to its contemplative nature and the quartet's success at a new musical palette, which brought in funk, hip hop and R&B sounds.

Composition
Wink has been noted for adding hip hop and R&B alongside the quartet's signature dance-punk and pop rock. Many publications echoed this positively, with many finding funk, house, pop and soul stylings woven throughout as well.

It has been noted as "all analogue R&B and garage punk with a rap verse".

Critical reception

Wink received acclaim from music critics. On Metacritic, it has received a score of 80 out of 100, based on 11 reviews, indicating "generally favorable reviews".

Tara Joshi for The Quietus applauded it as their "most comforting listen to date". Clare Martin for Paste called it "fun and filling" and noted the quartet made "every moment feel like a treat". The album was placed at number 47 in The Guardians list of the 50 best albums of 2021, with Laura Snapes describing it as "blissed-out, dreamy synth-pop".

Track listing

Personnel
Sourced from AllMusic.Chai'
 Mana - vocals, keyboards
 Kana - vocals, guitar
 Yuuki - bass, choir/chorus
 Yuna - drums, choir/chorus

References 

Chai (band) albums
2021 albums
Japanese-language albums